Taesa  is one of the largest Brazilian electric power transmission company. It is majority owned by Belo Horizonte based CEMIG, but the Bogotá based Interconexion Eléctrica is the second largest shareholder of Taesa.

The company operates approximately 10,000 kilometers of transmission lines in 18 Brazilian states.

Currently, Taesa has 34 transmission concessions, segregated into 10 concessions that make up the holding company; 5 full investees and 19 participations.
The Paraguaçu, Aimorés and Lot 1 concessions are joint ventures with CTEEP - which holds 50% of the capital of each of them.

In addition, it has assets in 67 substations with a voltage level between 230 and 525kV, present in all regions of the country and an Operation and Control Center located in Brasília.

See also
CEMIG
Electricity sector in Brazil

References

External links
Taesa - official website (Portuguese)
Taesa stock quote on Bloomberg - TAEE11

Electric power transmission system operators in Brazil
Energy companies established in 2000
2000 establishments in Brazil
Electric power companies of Brazil
Companies based in Rio de Janeiro (city)
Companies listed on B3 (stock exchange)
Brazilian brands